Kalbir Singh Takher (born in Wolverhampton, United Kingdom) is an English field hockey player, who participated in the Summer Olympics for Great Britain: in 1996.
Kalbir, nicknamed Kali played club hockey for Cannock and continues to coach hockey for a number of clubs and ages.

References 

 Profile at Olympics.org.uk

External links
 

1968 births
Living people
English male field hockey players
English people of Indian descent
Olympic field hockey players of Great Britain
Field hockey players at the 1996 Summer Olympics
Sportspeople from Wolverhampton